Miltochrista fuscozonata is a moth of the family Erebidae first described by Shōnen Matsumura in 1931. It is found in Taiwan.

References

Moths described in 1980
fuscozonata
Moths of Taiwan
Taxa named by Shōnen Matsumura